A zygote is a fertilized biological cell.

Zygote may also refer to:

 Zygote (album), the first solo album from John Popper
 Zygote (software), a software component of the Android operating system
 Zygote Media Group, a high-end 3D rendering and animation software company
 Zygote in My Coffee, an underground magazine in the United States published 2003–2010
  Zygote (2017), a short SF/horror movie created by Oats Studios